Mycoaciella is a genus of corticioid fungi in the family Meruliaceae. The genus was circumscribed by John Eriksson and Leif Ryvarden in 1978. After microscopic examination of the three species then in the genus, Karen Nakasone proposed to synonymize Mycoaciella with Phlebia.

Species
Mycoaciella badia (Pat.) Hjortstam & Ryvarden 2004)
Mycoaciella bispora  (Stalpers) J.Erikss. & Ryvarden (1978)
Mycoaciella brunnea (Jülich) Hjortstam & Spooner (1990)
Mycoaciella dusenii (Henn.) Hjortstam & Ryvarden (2009)
Mycoaciella hinnulea (Bres.) Hjortstam & Ryvarden (1980)

References

Polyporales genera
Meruliaceae
Taxa named by Leif Ryvarden
Fungi described in 1978